ISAT can stand for:

International Subarachnoid Aneurysm Trial
Illinois Standards Achievement Test
Idaho Standards Achievement Test
In Situ Adaptive Tabulation
International Student Admissions Test
International Schools Association of Thailand
Internet Security Awareness Training
Innovative Space-based Radar Antenna Technology
Institut supérieur de l'automobile et des transports
Iodine Satellite

See also
 I.Sat—Latin American cable channel